Chillaa is the second studio album by Finnish teen pop singer Robin. It was released through Universal Music Finland.

Track listing
"Chillaillaan"
"Puuttuva palanen" (featuring Brädi)
"Luupilla mun korvissa"
"Biologiaa"
"Biisi ystäville"
"Kaunis luonnostaan"
"Paniikkiin"
"Häröilemään"
"Sisko"
"Haluun sun palaavan"

Deluxe Edition

Chillaa was also released as a Deluxe edition containing the same main tracks of the ordinary release in addition to:

Bonus tracks:
11. "Puuttuva palanen" (acoustic)
12. "Luupilla mun korvissa" (acoustic)
13. "Puuttuva palanen" (Wildzide remix)
14. "Chillaillaan" (Sillyhatz remix)
15. "Loopilla mun korvissa" (DJ Dosse Epic Slowjam FM remix)

Special bonus:
16. "Kun nuoruus päättyy" (featuring The Rasmus)

Charts

References

2012 albums
Robin (singer) albums